Adam Peter Mansfield (born 21 August 1991) is an English former first-class cricketer.

Mansfield was born at Bury St Edmunds in August 1991. He was educated at the Colchester Institute, before going up to Anglia Ruskin University. While studying at Anglia Ruskin, he made two appearances in first-class cricket for Cambridge MCCU in 2014, against Surrey and Essex. He scored 38 runs in these matches, with a high score of 31 not out. In addition to playing first-class cricket, Mansfield also played minor counties cricket for Suffolk from 2011 to 2019, making 31 appearances in the Minor Counties Championship, eighteen appearances in the MCCA Knockout Trophy, and sixteen appearances in the Minor Counties T20.

References

External links

1991 births
Living people
Sportspeople from Bury St Edmunds
Alumni of Anglia Ruskin University
English cricketers
Suffolk cricketers
Cambridge MCCU cricketers